A referendum on a new law on dogs was held in Liechtenstein on 5 November 2006. The proposal was approved by 62.7% of voters.

Results

References

2006 referendums
2006 in Liechtenstein
Referendums in Liechtenstein
November 2006 events in Europe